Hewaheta is a village in Sri Lanka. It is located within Central Province.

Notable people
Charles Spearman Armstrong (1847–1924) was a pioneer in growing tea and cinchona in Sri Lanka at the Rookwood plantation, near Hewaheta, from 1864. His grandson Neville Armstrong was born there.

See also
List of towns in Central Province, Sri Lanka

References

External links

Populated places in Kandy District